Canciones Para La Luna - Sinfónico En Vivo (English: Songs for the Moon - Symphonic Live) is the first album of Belanova in symphonic format where all songs were modified and played with a symphony orchestra, was recorded in the Roberto Cantoral Cultural Center on September 2 and went on sale in digital format through a promotion of Pepsi on October 8 with only 10 songs, up to December 13 Belanova I present in physical format and by a DVD with a total of 15 songs and videos.

Singles 
The first single was "Sólo Dos" which was officially launched on October 8, 2013, with his video channel Vevo Belanova, reaching the highest places of popularity in México.

The second single, "Por Ti" being one original song of the album Dulce Beat but with changing rhythms and symphonic orchestra which was a gift for his fans of his early career. To close with the promotion of singles Belanova disk hill with a song duet "No Voy a Parar" the singer Jay de la Cueva of the Moderatto group which was launched officially on July 25, 2014 being the third and final single from the band.

Track listing

References 

2013 albums
Live Latin pop albums
Compositions for symphony orchestra